The 1995 Mid-Continent Conference men's basketball tournament was held March 3–7, 1995, at campus sites.
This was the twelfth edition of the tournament for the Association of Mid-Continent Universities, now known as the Summit League. As a result of 6 schools leaving the Mid-Continent Conference for what would become the Horizon League the winner did not receive an automatic bid to the 1995 NCAA Division I men's basketball tournament, when in previous years that had been the case.

Bracket

References 

Summit League men's basketball tournament
1994–95 Mid-Continent Conference men's basketball season
1995 in sports in Indiana